Celtic Football Club are a Scottish professional association football club based in Glasgow. They have played at their home ground, Celtic Park, since 1892. Celtic were founding members of the Scottish Football League in 1890, and the Scottish Premier League in 1998 as well as the Scottish Professional Football League in 2013.

The list encompasses the major honours won by Celtic, records set by the club, their managers and their players. The player records section includes details of the club's leading goalscorers and those who have made most appearances in first-team competitions. It also records notable achievements by Celtic players on the international stage, and the highest transfer fees paid and received by the club. Attendance records at Celtic Park, and also at Hampden Park which has on occasion been used for home games, are also included.

Celtic have won 52 top-flight titles, and hold the record for most Scottish Cup wins with 40. The club's record appearance maker is Billy McNeill, who made 822 appearances between 1957 and 1975. Jimmy McGrory is the club's record goalscorer, scoring 522 goals during his Celtic career.

All figures are correct as of 26 February 2023.

Honours
Celtic's first ever silverware was won in 1889 when they defeated Cowlairs 6–1 in the final of the North-Eastern Cup. A year later they won the Glasgow Cup, before winning their first major national honour in 1892 by defeating Queen's Park 5–1 in the final of the Scottish Cup. Celtic won their first league title in 1892–93. In 1906–07 Celtic became the first club to win the league and cup double in Scotland, a feat they have now accomplished on 12 occasions. They won their first domestic treble in 1966–67, the same season they became the first British club to win the European Cup with their 2–1 victory over Inter Milan in the final. Celtic's most recent success was their win in the 2022-23 Scottish League Cup.

In all, Celtic have won the Scottish League Championship 52 times, the Scottish Cup a record 40 times, the Scottish League Cup 21 times and the European Cup once. They have completed seven domestic trebles, including an unprecedented quadruple treble between the 16/17 and 19/20 seasons, a joint world record with domestic rivals Rangers.

Domestic
League
Scottish League Championship:
Winners (52): 1893, 1894, 1896, 1898,1905, 1906, 1907, 1908, 1909, 1910, 1914, 1915, 1916, 1917, 1919, 1922, 1926, 1936, 1938, 1954, 1966, 1967, 1968, 1969, 1970, 1971, 1972, 1973, 1974, 1977, 1979, 1981, 1982,1986, 1988, 1998, 2001, 2002, 2004, 2006, 2007, 2008, 2012, 2013, 2014, 2015, 2016, 2017, 2018, 2019, 2020, 2022
Runners-up (32): 1892, 1895, 1900, 1901, 1902, 1912, 1913, 1918, 1920, 1921, 1928, 1929, 1930, 1935, 1939, 1955, 1976, 1980, 1983, 1984, 1985, 1987, 1996, 1997, 1999, 2000, 2003, 2005, 2009, 2010, 2011, 2021

Cups
Scottish Cup:
Winners (40): 1892, 1899, 1900, 1904, 1907, 1908, 1911, 1912, 1914, 1923, 1925, 1927, 1931, 1933, 1937, 1951, 1954, 1965, 1967, 1969, 1971, 1972, 1974, 1975, 1977, 1980, 1985, 1988, 1989, 1995, 2001, 2004, 2005, 2007, 2011, 2013, 2017, 2018, 2019, 2020
Runners-up (18): 1889, 1893, 1894, 1901, 1902, 1926, 1928, 1955, 1956, 1961, 1963, 1966, 1970, 1973, 1984, 1990, 1999, 2002
Scottish League Cup:
Winners (21): 1957, 1958, 1966, 1967, 1968, 1969, 1970, 1975, 1983, 1998, 2000, 2001, 2006, 2009, 2015, 2017, 2018, 2019, 2020, 2022, 2023
Runners-up (15): 1965, 1971, 1972, 1973, 1974, 1976, 1977, 1978, 1984, 1987, 1991, 1995, 2003, 2011, 2012

International
 European Cup:
 Winners: 1967
 Runners-up: 1970
 UEFA Cup
 Runners-up: 2003
 Intercontinental Cup
 Runners-up: 1967

Others

 Glasgow Cup: 29 (contested by youth teams from 1990, see below)
 1891, 1892, 1895, 1896, 1905, 1906, 1907, 1908, 1910, 1916, 1917, 1920, 1921, 1927, 1928, 1929, 1931, 1939, 1941, 1949, 1956, 1962, 1964, 1965, 1967, 1968, 1970, 1975 (shared)*, 1982* 1975 trophy shared with Rangers after a 2–2 draw.

 Glasgow Charity Cup: 28
 1892, 1893, 1894, 1895, 1896, 1899, 1903, 1905, 1908, 1912, 1913, 1914, 1915, 1916, 1917, 1918, 1920, 1921, 1924, 1926, 1936, 1937, 1938, 1943, 1950, 1953, 1959, 1961 (shared)** 1961 trophy shared with Clyde after a 1–1 draw.

Cross Border

 British League Cup: 1
 1902

 Ferencvaros Vase: 1
 1914

 Empire Exhibition Trophy: 1
 1938

 Coronation Cup: 1
 1953

 Dubai Champions Cup: 1
 1989

National

 Saint Mungo Cup: 1
 1951

 Drybrough Cup: 1
 1974

Regional

  Glasgow North Eastern Cup: 2
 1888–89, 1889–90

Clydesdale Harriers Cup: 1
 1889–90

 Glasgow Football League: 1
 1898–99

 Inter City Football League: 1
 1899–1900

 Benefit Tournament: 1
 1902

 War Fund Shield: 1
 1918
St Vincent de Paul Charity Cup: 1
 1928

 Victory in Europe Cup: 1
 1945

Indoor football

 Daily Express National Fives: 1
 1981

 Tennents' Sixes: 1
 1992

Friendly
Tournoi Franco-Britannique de Paris: 1
 1921

 D. Kennedy Cup: 1
 1951

 Alfredo di Stefano Trophy: 1
 1967

 CNE Cup of Champions: 1
 1968

 World of Soccer Cup: 1
 1977

 Feyenoord Tournament: 1
 1981

 Celtic Centenary Cup: 1
 1988

GFR Challenge Trophy: 1 
1989

 Bord Gais Trophy: 1
 1992

 Brother Walfrid Kearns Trophy: 1
 1994

 Hamilton Cup: 1
 1994

 Brandy Cup: 1
 1999

 Translink Cup: 1
 2009

 Wembley Cup: 1
 2009

 Fenway Football Challenge: 1
 2010

 Dublin Decider: 1
 2013

 Dafabet Cup: 1
 2017

Reserve 
League

Scottish Reserve League: 9
 1895–96, 1958–59, 1959–60, 1960–61, 1962–63, 1964–65, 1965–66, 1969–70, 1970–71

Premier Reserve League: 5
 1979–80, 1984–85, 1990–91, 1993–94, 1994–95

 SPL Reserve League: 5
 2004–05, 2005–06, 2006–07, 2007–08, 2008–09

 Scottish Alliance: 4
 1921–22, 1933–34, 1936–37, 1937–38

Cup

 Scottish 2nd FA XI Cup: 8
 1890–91, 1934–35, 1935–36, 1957–58, 1965–66, 1970–71, 1973–74, 1984–85
 Reserve League Cup: 13
 1959–60, 1966–67, 1968–69, 1969–70, 1970–71, 1979–80, 1980–81, 1985–86, 1989–90, 1991–92, 1993–94, 1994–95, 1995–96,

Celtic 'Third XI'

Combined Reserve League: 3
 1960–61, 1962 –63, 1963–64

CRL Autumn Series: 1
  1963–64

CRL Spring Series: 4
 1959–60 (West), 1961–62, 1962–63, 1965–66

Other

Kilsyth Charity Cup: 1
 1889

Friendly

 Jock Stein Friendship Cup: 9
 2006, 2007, 2008, 2009, 2010, 2016, 2017, 2018, 2019

John Reames Trophy: 1
 2010

GFR Challenge Cup: 1
 2019

Youth honours
 Scottish Youth Cup: 15
 1984, 1987, 1989, 1996, 1997, 1999, 2003, 2005, 2006, 2010, 2011, 2012, 2013, 2015, 2017
 SPFL Development League: 12 (Previously SFL Youth/SPL U18/U19 league)
 1995, 2000, 2003, 2004, 2005, 2006, 2010, 2011, 2012, 2013, 2014, 2016
 Under 21 Scottish Premier League: 3
 2002, 2003, 2004
 Glasgow Cup: 11 (contested by senior team until 1989, see above)
 1990, 1991, 1997, 1998, 2008, 2011, 2014, 2015, 2016, 2017, 2019

Women's Team 
 Scottish Women's Premier League
 Runners-up: 2009, 2010, 2021
 Scottish Cup
 Winners: 2022
 Runners-up: 2008
 Scottish Premier League Cup
 Winners: 2010, 2021
 Runners-up: 2017, 2018

Awards 

 BBC Sports Team of the Year: 1
 1967

 France Football European Team of the Year: 1
 1970

 SPFA Special Merit Award: 1
 1992 (awarded to Lisbon Lions)

 FIFA Fair Play Award: 1
 2003 (awarded to fans of Celtic FC)

 UEFA Fair Play Award: 1
 2003 (awarded to fans of Celtic FC)

 FIFA Fan Award: 1
 2017 (awarded to fans of Celtic FC)

Sunday Mail and sportScotland Team of the Year: 1
 2017

 Scottish Football Hall of Fame: 1
 2017 (Lisbon Lions inducted)

 IFFHS World Club Team of the Month: 3
 November 2002, August 2003, August 2012

Other 
Scottish Programme of the Year: 2
 1985–86, 1990–91

Premier Division Programme of the Year: 2
 1985–86, 1990–91

 Polar Bear Trophy: 1
 1975

 Real Madrid Silver Cabin: 1
 1979

 Best Support Technology for Fans: 1 
 2014 (UK Sports Technology Awards)

Best Corporate Social Responsibility: 1
 2015 (awarded to Celtic FC Foundation)

 SFP Facilities Award: 1
 2016

 Best Fan Experience: 1
 2017 (UK Stadium Business Awards)

 CAFE Collaboration Award: 1
 2018 (awarded to club and its Disabled Supporters' Association)

Player records

Appearances

Most appearances in all competitions: Billy McNeill, 822
Most League appearances: Alec McNair, 583
Most Scottish Cup appearances: Billy McNeill, 94
Most League Cup appearances: Billy McNeill, 138
Most European appearances: Scott Brown, 127
Youngest first-team player: Jack Aitchison, 16 years, 71 days (against Motherwell, 15 May 2016)
Youngest first-team player in European competition: Karamoko Dembélé, 16 years, 294 days (against CFR Cluj, 12 December 2019)
Oldest first-team player: Alec McNair,  (against Queens Park, 18 April 1925)
Oldest debutant: Dion Dublin,  (against Rangers, 12 February 2006)
Most appearances in a season: Tommy Gemmell and John Clark, 62 (during the 1966–67 season)
Longest-serving player: Alec McNair, 21 years (1904–1925)

Most appearances
Competitive, professional matches only (as of match played 15 May 2021).

Goalscorers

Most goals in all competitions: Jimmy McGrory, 522.
Most League goals: Jimmy McGrory, 396.
Most Scottish Cup goals: Jimmy McGrory, 74.
Most League Cup goals: Bobby Lennox, 63.
Most European goals: Henrik Larsson, 35.
Most goals in one season: Jimmy McGrory, 62 (during the 1927–28 season).
Most League goals in one season: Jimmy McGrory, 50 (during the 1935–36 season).
Most hat-tricks: Jimmy McGrory, 56 (55 games including one double hat-trick)
Most penalties scored: Mike Haughney, 23.
Most goals scored by player in a match:
League match: Jimmy McGrory, 8 goals, won 9–0 (against Dunfermline Athletic, 14 January 1928).
Scottish Cup match: John Campbell, 7 goals (against 5th KRV, 17 December 1892).
Scottish League Cup match: 
Bobby Lennox, 5 goals (against Hamilton Academical, 11 September 1968).
Bobby Lennox, 5 goals (against Partick Thistle, 31 August 1968).
Stevie Chalmers, 5 goals (against Hamilton Academical, 11 September 1968).
Stevie Chalmers, 5 goals (against East Fife, 16 September 1964).
European match: Dariusz Dziekanowski, 4 goals (against Partizan Belgrade, 27 September 1989).
Fastest goal: Kris Commons 12.2 seconds (against Aberdeen, 16 March 2013)
Youngest goalscorer: Jack Aitchison, 16 years, 71 days (against Motherwell in Scottish Premiership, 15 May 2016).
Oldest goalscorer: Jimmy McMenemy,  (against Motherwell in league, 6 December 1919).

Top goalscorers
Competitive, professional matches only. Matches played appear in brackets.

1 Comprises appearances in the European Cup / Champions League, European Cup Winners Cup, UEFA Cup / Europa League, Inter-Cities Fairs Cup and the Intercontinental Cup.

2 Includes cup competitions: the Glasgow Cup, Drybrough Cup and the Anglo-Scottish Cup. Appearance and goal statistics are not readily available for the Glasgow Charity Cup.

3 In addition to these statistics, it is known that McGrory made a further 21 appearances in the Glasgow Charity Cup, scoring 20 goals. This makes McGrory's overall total of goals for Celtic in senior competitions 522 goals.

International
First capped player: Willie Groves and Thomas McKeown (for Scotland, against Ireland, 9 March 1889).
Most international caps while a Celtic player: Pat Bonner, 80 for Republic of Ireland.
Most international caps for Scotland while a Celtic player: Paul McStay, 76.
Most capped player to play for Celtic: Robbie Keane, 143 for Republic of Ireland (3 caps whilst at Celtic).
Most international goals while a Celtic player: Henrik Larsson, 21 for Sweden.

World Cup
First Celtic player to appear at a World Cup: Willie Fernie and Neil Mochan (for Scotland against Austria 8 June 1954).
First Celtic player to score at a World Cup: Bobby Collins (for Scotland, against Paraguay, 11 June 1958).
Most World Cup appearances while a Celtic player: Pat Bonner, 9.
Most World Cup goals while a Celtic player: Henrik Larsson, 5.
First World Cup winner to play for Celtic: Juninho.

European Championship
First Celtic player to appear at a European Championship: Pat Bonner, Mick McCarthy and Chris Morris (for Republic of Ireland, against England, 12 June 1988).
First Celtic player to score at a European Championship: Paul McStay for Scotland, against CIS, 18 June 1992).
Most European Championship appearances while a Celtic player: Henrik Larsson, 7.
Most European Championship goals while a Celtic player: Henrik Larsson, 4.

Transfers

Record transfer fees paid

Record transfer fees received

Managerial records 

First manager: Willie Maley, from 1897 to 1940.
Longest-serving manager by time: Willie Maley, 42 years and 9 months (April 1897 to 1 January 1940).
Shortest-serving manager by time: Lou Macari, 7 months and 19 days, 34 matches (27 October 1993 to 15 June 1994).
Shortest-serving manager by matches: John Barnes, 29 matches, 8 months (10 June 1999 to 10 February 2000).

Club records

Matches

Firsts
First match: vs. Rangers, Friendly, Won 5–2, Celtic Park, (Glasgow), (H), 28 May 1888
First Scottish Cup match: vs. Shettleston, Won 5–1, Celtic Park, (Glasgow), (H), 1 September 1888
First League match: vs. Heart of Midlothian, Won 5–0, Tynecastle Stadium, (Edinburgh), (A), 23 August 1890
First League Cup match: vs. Hibernian, Lost 2–4, Easter Road, (Edinburgh), (H), 21 September 1946
First European match: vs. Valencia, Lost 2–4, Inter-Cities Fairs Cup, Mestalla, (Spain), (A), 26 September 1962

Wins
Record win: 11–0 (against Dundee, 26 October 1895)
Record League win: 11–0 (against Dundee, 26 October 1895)
Record away win: 9–0 (against Dundee United, 28 August 2022)
Record away League win: 9–0 (against Dundee United, 28 August 2022)
Record Scottish Cup win: 8–0 (against Cowlairs, 22 September 1888)
Record League Cup win: 10–0 (against Hamilton Academical, 11 September 1968)
Record European win: 9–0 (against KPV Kokkola, 16 September 1970)

Defeats
Record defeat: 0–8 (against Motherwell, 30 April 1937)
Record League defeat: 0–8 (against Motherwell, 30 April 1937)
Record Scottish Cup defeat:
 0–4 (against Rangers, 14 April 1928)
 0–4 (against St. Mirren, 4 April 1959)
Record League Cup defeat:
 2–6 (against Clyde, 23 March 1946)
 0–4 (against Rangers, 31 August 1955)
Record European defeat: 0–7 (against Barcelona, 13 September 2016)

Goals
Most League goals scored in a season: 116 goals in the 1915–16 season
Most goals scored in all competitions in a season: 196 goals in the 1966–67 season

Points
Most points in a season (3 points per win): 106 (during the 2016–17 season).
Most points in a season (2 points per win): 72 (during the 1987–88 season).
Fewest points in a season (2 points per win):
21 (during the 1896–97 season over 18 games).
25 (during the 1947–48 season over 30 games).

Attendances
Record attendance: 147,365 (against Aberdeen, won 2–1, Hampden Park (N), 24 April 1937). (A record for a Football match in Europe)
Record Scottish League home attendance: 83,500 (against Rangers, won 3–0, Celtic Park (H), 1 January 1938).
Record European match attendance: 133,961 (against Leeds United, won 2–1, Hampden Park (H), 15 April 1970). (A record for a match in UEFA European competition)

Other records and statistics
 World record for total number of goals scored in a season (competitive games only): 196 (1966–67 season)
 UK record for an unbeaten run in professional football: 69 games (60 won; 9 drawn) 16 May 2016 to 17 December 2017.
 SPL record for an unbeaten run of home matches (League, Europe, Scottish Cup, League Cup) (77), from 2001 to 2004
 14 consecutive League Cup final appearances, from 1964–65 season to 1977–78 inclusive, a world record for successive appearances in the final of a major football competition
 Most successive Scottish Cup tie wins: 19 (22 January 2017 – 19 December 2020; none going to extra time nor penalties aside from the last match on 19 December 2020)
 Most successive League Cup tie wins: 19 (19 August 1967 – 12 August 1969)
 Most goals scored in one Scottish top-flight league match by one player: 8 goals by Jimmy McGrory against Dunfermline in 9–0 win on 14 January 1928
 Highest score in a domestic British cup final: Celtic 7–1 Rangers, Scottish League Cup Final 1957
 Fastest hat-trick in European Club Football – Mark Burchill vs Jeunesse Esch in 2000; 3 minutes (between 12th minute and 15th minute), a record at the time
 Earliest SPL Championship won: won with 8 games remaining in 2017 (equalling all-time Scottish top-flight record set by Rangers in 1929)
 Biggest margin of victory in the SPL. 9–0 against Aberdeen, 6 November 2010
 Celtic and Hibernian hold the record for the biggest transfer fee between two Scottish clubs. Celtic bought Scott Brown from Hibernian on 16 May 2007 for £4.4m
 Most expensive export from Scottish football, Kieran Tierney to Arsenal, August 2019, for about £25 million.
 First weekly club publication in the UK, The Celtic View
 First European club to field a player from the Indian sub-continent, Mohammed Salim
 First British club to reach the final of the European Cup, and the only Scottish, and first British team to win the European Cup

European statistics

 Most appearances: Scott Brown, 127
 Most goals: Henrik Larsson, 35
 Biggest win: Celtic 9–0 KPV Kokkola, in the European Cup, 16 September 1970
 Biggest defeat: Barcelona 7–0 Celtic in the UEFA Champions League, 13 September 2016
 Highest home attendance (Hampden Park): 136,505, against Leeds United in the 1969–70 European Cup
 (Celtic Park): 77,240, against Fiorentina in the 1969–70 European Cup

See also
 Celtic F.C.
 Celtic F.C. in Europe
 Celtic Park
 List of Celtic F.C. players
 Lennoxtown Training Centre
 Celtic F.C. Reserve and Youth squads
 Celtic F.C. and World War I
 Sport in Scotland
 Football in Scotland

Footnotes

References

External links
 – Brief History

Celtic
Records
Records